A ged is a heraldic term for the fish known in English as a pike. It is often used in "canting" coats; that is, using coats of arms to make a pun on the last name of the bearer, one of his titles, a nickname, or the name of his estate. The word ged is derived from the Old Norse  (spike).

References

Heraldic beasts
Esox
Fish in heraldry